Gaugeac is a commune in the Dordogne department in Nouvelle-Aquitaine in southwestern France.

Population

Geography
Gaugeac borders eight other communes including one, Parranquet, in the department of Lot-et-Garonne. To the north, the communal territory is about fifty meters from that of Lavalade.

See also
Communes of the Dordogne department

References

Communes of Dordogne